Port Pirie South is a settlement in South Australia. It is a predominantly residential suburb of industrial city of Port Pirie.

The suburb began as a private subdivision of Sections 141, 142, 167 and 169 of the Hundred of Pirie. Its boundaries were established pursuant to the Geographical Names Act, 1969 in 1978. Since then, it has given up land to Coonamia in 1995 and absorbed land from Solomontown in 2013.

References

Towns in South Australia
Port Pirie